Zarhalol, formerly known as Kommunizm, is a jamoat in north-western Tajikistan. It is part of the city of Istaravshan in Sughd Region. The jamoat has a total population of 30,683 (2015). It consists of 12 villages, including Istaravshan (the seat), Navkat and Oboddara.

References

Populated places in Sughd Region
Jamoats of Tajikistan